Lumami is a village located in the Zünheboto District of the North-East Indian state of Nagaland.

References

http://www.whoyiz.com/india/Nagaland/Lumami/87656
http://villages.ws/india/nagaland/zunheboto/lumami_akuluto_0243829.htm

Villages in Zünheboto district